Tharandt is a municipality in Saxony, Germany, situated on the Weißeritz, 9 miles southwest of Dresden.

It has a Protestant Church and the oldest academy of forestry in Germany, founded as the Royal Saxon Academy of Forestry by Heinrich Cotta in 1811, together with its arboretum, the Forstbotanischer Garten Tharandt. In 2002, a severe flood destroyed many of the academy buildings and the library, including some of its more-than-500-year old books. The academy was rebuilt and today has about 650 students and is famous for its long traditions of educating students from all over the world in (tropical) forestry, resource management and sustainable land use.

In the early 20th century, Tharandt was a favorite summer resort of the people of Dresden, one of its principal charms being the magnificent beech woods which surround it.

Personalities connected to the town

 Sidonie of Poděbrady (died 1510 in Tharandt), Duchess of Saxony, wife of the Duke Albrecht the Boldheart 
 Johann Wolfgang von Goethe (1749–1832), poet, theater director, naturalist, art theorist and statesman;  he visited Heinrich Cotta several times from 1811  
 Friedrich Schiller (1759–1805) was in the town in 1787
 Heinrich Cotta (1763–1844), forestry scholar, lived in Tharandt since 1811, where he was director of the Royal Saxon Forestry Academy.
 Carsten Egeberg Borchgrevink (1864 – 1934), Anglo-Norwegian polar explorer and a pioneer of modern Antarctic travel, attended the Royal Saxon Forestry Academy (1885–88)

References